Diversity marketing (inclusive marketing, inclusion marketing, or in-culture marketing) is a marketing paradigm which sees marketing (and especially marketing communications) as a way to connect with the different individuals in the market. As society has progressed companies have learned that not everyone can be chalked up as the same and that every person has different life experiences, may it be religion culture or beliefs. 

"Diversity marketing involves acknowledging that marketing and advertising must offer alternative ways of communicating to these diverse groups. With that knowledge, diversity marketers aim to develop a mix of different communication methods, in order to reach people in each of the diverse groups present in the market" Thus diversity marketing is the process in which companies study the market they are in or about to enter by different mean(e.g. surveys, focus groups or in some cases telecommunication). Diversity marketing is helping business owners and operators in all levels to connect with society through communication channels that best reach them, this creates exposure for the company which creates brand awareness. Diversity marketing realizes the markets vast differences and the market/consumers have different tastes may it be values, beliefs, interaction type and lifestyle choices. Such vast differences are then tackled by customized marketing strategies

"From a Marketing management perspective, culturally diverse environments, creates new challenges in recognizing, cultivating and reconciling different culture groups' perspectives within the same market"

References
 Dahl, S. Diversity Marketing, Thomson, 2002 
 Dahl, S.(2004) Cross-Cultural Advertising Research: What Do We Know About the Influence of Culture on Advertising? London, England.
 TransCity, European online platform on diversity marketing

Notes

Types of marketing